Escape (1988) is an Egyptian film directed by Atef El-Tayeb (26 December 1947 – 23 June 1995).After his discharge from prison, Mansor take his revenge and become hunted by the police. The Escape" is one of the icons of the Egyptian cinema in the nineties, and it was presented in 91, and it is one of the most important films dating for the generation of the eighties in the Egyptian cinema

Description 
The movie begins with an artistic suggestion that the authority is not always the policeman who chases the criminal, but sometimes it becomes the criminal who tries to evade the punishment of the police.

The film "Escape" is described as the most daring in the history of Egyptian cinema, and this may have been true to a large extent, but it is not only boldness that is the secret of this film, it is also described as being the first to criticize many social and political negatives. Perhaps this was also true, as the film discusses people's pressing issues, but not precedence is the only  secret of this movie. There may be earlier or more daring films, but there is no doubt that "Escape" is the most honest.

Falconer 
Muntaser Abdel Ghaffar Al-Badri (Ahmed Zaki) is a young man from the village of Al-Hajer, from the works of the Saqilat Center in Sohag. Montaser's father is a falconer, he spends months in the desert following the falcons to hunt them, and Montaser was fond of his father's work, and influenced by the fact that the falcon flies high above everyone and only goes down for hunting, and so that Montaser does not inherit his father's work, his mother, after the death of her husband, burned all the hunting tools which was in his possession, so as not to be inherited by Muntasir, whose adventures, young and young, were stressing his mother, who was more proud of her eldest son Abdullah, who was obedient to her command and helped her to cultivate the land. Medhat (Youssef Fawzy) for the deportation of Egyptian workers to the Gulf, and Muntasir wrote his book on his cousin Zainab (Aida Fahmy), who was born in Cairo.

On the audio tape, there are mourning for a Saedi man that also coincides with the mourning that can be heard in the tales of the rababa, warning of the occurrence of the tragedy.

Global Idea 
Three criminal figures surround the young Al-Saeedi Montaser (Ahmed Zaki) for turning him into a serial killer. The first is Medhat (Youssef Fawzy), the director of the office of workers' travel to the Gulf, with forged visas, where Montaser joins him and pays him to get money from the workers. After that, Medhat plants a piece of hashish for Muntasir and reports it to the police, who will be tried and imprisoned. When he comes out, he faces the second character, Rajwat, who seduced Montaser's wife into prostitution in Turkey for her own sake. Montaser is accused of killing her, and he continues his escape. The third is his old friend Saeed, who betrayed him and stole his money and reported him to the police. Police officer Salem (Abdulaziz Makhyoun) takes on the task of arresting Montaser, but things escalate to an extent that no one could have imagined, changing their lives forever.

Characters 
 Ahmed Zaki as Muntasir Abdel Ghafour
Abdelaziz Makhyoun as Salem( the officer)
 Hala Sedky as Sabah( dancer)
 Zozo Nabil as Muntasir's mother
 Abu Bakr Ezzat as Ismail( major General)
 Hassan Hosny as ( Assistant Minister)
 Mohamed Wafik as Fouad Al-Sharnoubi
 Youssef Fawzy as( Medhat)
 Mahmoud Al-Bazzawi as( Abdullah Abdul Ghaffar)
 Abdullah Musharraf as Omran
 Laila Shaer as Najwan
 Aida Fahmy as Zainab
 Sherif Mounir
 Bassam Ragab as Kamal( Officer)
 Hanim Muhammed
 Samir Waheed as( Farid Ezzat - coin dealer)
 Ahmed Abu Obeya
 Ahmad Adam as( Aziz - journalist)
 Mohamed Henedy as( Qanawi Abu Ismail)
 Mutawa Owais
 Mohammed Abu Hashish
 Ahmed Abdel Aziz
 Salah Abdullah as( Forger Mr. Makhzanji)
 Mofeed Ashour

Staff 

 Atef El-Tayeb as A film director.
 Written by: Mustafa Muharram (Story) Bashir Al Deek (Screenplay and Dialogue)
 Mohsen Nasr as Director of Photography
 Nadia Shoukry (montage)
 Production Department: Tamidou Production and Distribution (Medhat El Sherif)
 Ibrahim Al-Mashnab as Executive Producer
 Magdy Kamel (II) (Audio Engineer)
 Tamido Productions and Distribution as Distribution Company
The soundtrack, which is one of the immortal works of Modi Al-Imam, was sung on the stage of the program with the voice of many young talents and led by the orchestra of musician Nader Abbasi

References

External links 

 Atef El-Tayeb at IMDb
 Escape at the TCM Movie Database
 Arabic Movies Databaseon Official Website

Egyptian drama films